Devanapathis International Samatha-vipassana Meditation Center; commonly known as Pallekele Meditation Center is Buddhist monastery in Kandy, Sri Lanka. It was founded by late Ven. Walane Amatha Gavesi Thero in 1991. The monastery is located in old Gam Uadawa premises in Pallekele, around 8 Kilometers from the Kandy town.

References 

Buddhist monasteries in Sri Lanka
Buildings and structures in Kandy District